The E7 European long distance path or E7 path is one of the European long-distance paths from the Portuguese-Spanish border eastwards through Andorra, France, Italy, Slovenia, Hungary and Serbia.  It is projected to be extended to Lisbon and into Romania, so that it reaches from the Atlantic to the Black Sea, however these stages, as well as parts of the route through Italy, are still in planning.

Route 
Some of the places passed on the west-to-east route include:
 Monfortinho, Portugal
 Spain: see GR7 path
 Catalonia,
Andalucía
Murcia
Valencia
Catalonia
 Andorra
 Mt Aigoual, France
 Lubéron, France
 Grasse, France
 hills above Nice, France
 Monte Lavagnola, Italy
 Travo, Italy
 Hodoš, Slovenia
 Bajánsenye, Hungary
 Szekszárd, Hungary
 Öttömös, Hungary
 Nagylak, Hungary

External links

 E-Path overview at the European Ramblers' Association
 E7 at outdoorseiten 
 Kommission for European Footpaths in Slovenia
 European truck route planner
 Interactive map of E7 in Slovenia (Slovene language)
 E7 in Italy
 E7 in Serbia

Hiking trails in France
European long-distance paths
Hiking trails in Slovenia